The 1940 Iowa gubernatorial election was held on November 5, 1940. Incumbent Republican George A. Wilson defeated Democratic nominee John K. Valentine with 52.72% of the vote.

Primary elections
Primary elections were held on June 3, 1940.

Democratic primary

Candidates 
John K. Valentine, former Lieutenant Governor
Edward Breen, State Senator

Results

Republican primary

Candidates
George A. Wilson, incumbent Governor
H. R. Gross, Newspaper reporter
Irving H. Knudson, former State Senator

Results

General election

Candidates
Major party candidates
George A. Wilson, Republican
John K. Valentine, Democratic 

Other candidates
M. M. Heptonstall, Prohibition
Charles Speck, Communist

Results

References

1940
Iowa
Gubernatorial